Józef Makowski (1914–1997), was a Polish sculptor and painter whose works are associated with Bydgoszcz.

Biography

Youth
Józef Makowski was born in Toruń, then part of the German Empire, on August 19, 1914. He was the son of Józef and Anna née Besdun.

In Toruń, he attended the gimnasium "Nicolaus Copernicus". In 1935, he underwent training at the Reserve Cadet School in Brodnica, then Strasburg in Westpreußen. From that period dates one of his first works, a bust of Marshal Piłsudski.

After getting his matura, Józef studied from 1936 to 1939 at the Academy of Fine Arts in Warsaw, in the studio of prof. Tadeusz Breyer, working on sculpture and painting (portraits). He also started to appear in regional exhibitions.

Second World War
During World War II, Makowski was a Home Army second lieutenant of the 4th Infantry Division. Under the nom de guerre of "Ziuk", he served in the 67th Infantry Regiment.

Captured and wounded after the defeat, he was moved to the hospital of the Altergrabow camp. After recovery, he was placed in Sandbostel Stalag X-B, where he met Konstanty Ildefons Gałczyński, Roman Bratny and Jan Dobraczyński. From his friendship with Gałczyński, Józef Makowski made several portraits for the Polish poet.

Post War activity
Back to civilian life, Józef Makowski had various jobs: he participated in the decoration of the "industrial exhibition" that took place for the 600th anniversary of Bydgoszcz. Then he was the artistic director of a stone workshop, before working at the "Building ceramics factory" in Fordon. In 1947 he was employed as an announcer at the Polish Radio. 

Makowski associated mainly his artistic activity with the city of Bydgoszcz. His most remarkable works include the following elements:
 In the 1950s, Makowski realized 4 stone fishes gushing out water, placed in a pool to replace the monumental fountain "The Deluge". Melted down by German forces in 1942, the monument was located in the heart of the city, on Plac Wolności. Makowski's fishes were removed in 2010, when the colossal fountain started to be rebuilt. Stored away for more than 40 years, they have been restored by the University of Science and Technology. The city of Bydgoszcz has been putting them back into display since June 2, 2022, on the northern waterfront of the Mill Island.

 In 1969, the sculptor designed a monument called "The broken rose", in memoriam of 50 junior high school students murdered on September 5, 1939, by the Nazis. The laying obelisk-like work stands in Bydgoszcz's Jan Kochanowski Park.

 The 1971 memorial in the Bydgoszcz forest of Bielice, which was dedicated to the 51 citizens of the Szwederowo district murdered by the Nazis on December 5, 1939.

 Józef Makowski created between 1973 and 1975, two large outdoor sculptures, Frédéric Chopin and Ignacy Jan Paderewski. They are part of the outdoor gallery of monuments to composers and virtuosos of the Pomeranian Philharmonic.

 On August 31, 1975, he realized a grand memorial on the hill above the "Valley of Death", dedicated to the inhabitants of Bydgoszcz mass-murdered in this place in September–October 1939. Its composition portrays detached ears of grain on top of high columns, symbolizing the hands of the martyrs reaching out for the sky.

The author himself commented on his monument:

 In 1980, was unveiled the "Monument to the Polish aviators". It stands in the district of Błonie and commemorates Bydgoszcz long aviation tradition.

In addition, Józef Makowski realized interior design, such as for the Pharmacy Under the Swan in Gdańsk Street.

Furthermore, he was also a regular graphic designer for the local newspaper "Gazeta Pomorska" and the author of one of its vignettes.

Some of his sketches were exhibited at the Pomeranian Army Museum in Bydgoszcz, in two sessions: "Warsaw Insurgents' Gallery" and "Warsaw Insurgents in Caricature".
During his post-war career, he was participated in national (e.g. Radom, Zakopane) and foreign exhibitions (Florence, 1968). 

Makowski lived in Bydgoszcz (Błonie district) until the end of his life. In 1994, celebrating his 80th anniversary, a specific exhibition was organized at the Municipal Art Gallery of Bydgoszcz. 

Józef Makowski passed away on October 6, 1997. He was buried at the Holy Trinity Catholic Cemetery in Bydgoszcz.

Family
Józef Makowski was the first husband of Polish actress Helena Makowska-Fijewska (May 18, 1918, in Rybno – October 1, 1993, in Warsaw).
She was a student of Polish singer Eugenia Hoffman-Weikertowa.
She made her debut in 1946 in Łódź. She played afterwards at the "Nowy Theater" in Warsaw and at the Polish Theater (1968–1974).
Her repertoire included also TV, radio and movie roles.
Helena's second husband was Polish actor Tadeusz Fijewski (1911–1978).

Józef and Helena had a daughter, Ilona.

Helena's older sister was the actress Urszula Modrzyńska (1928–2010).

Works

Main works in Bydgoszcz

Two works from Makowski are no more existent:
 A street "Piggy bank" (1980s and 1990s), standing at the intersection of Mostowa street and Stary Rynek. It received inhabitants donations for the reconstruction of city monuments. 
 A carved handle door for the August Mentzel Tenement.

Other works
Józef Makowski created works in other cities, such as:
 the "Monument to the Greater Poland Insurgents" in Łabiszyn, unveiled on October 10, 1981;
  the "Monument to the Heroes of the fight for Polishness and freedom of the Mogilno land" in Mogilno, unveiled in 1964;
 the "Monument to Polish and Soviet soldiers" in Chełmża, now dismantled.

Makowski designed also interiors for "Herbapol" company establishments throughout Poland.

Furthermore, he realized graphics and paintings. Apart from Bydgoszcz institutions (e.g. City Hall, Provincial Office in Bydgoszcz, Leon Wyczółkowski's District Museum), his works are in the hand of private collectors, in Bydgoszcz, Poznań, Warsaw and abroad (Japan, Germany, Belgium).

Awards and commemoration
 Recipient of the Golden Cross of Merit, 1976;
 Badge of the Meritorious Activist of Culture, 1967;
 Badge of the Millennium of the Polish State, 1970;
 "Medal of the President of Bydgoszcz", 1994. 

On March 24, 2010, Bydgoszcz authorities named a street after Józef Makowski. It runs between Lisia street and the Bydgoszcz Canal in Prądy district.

See also

 Bydgoszcz
 List of Polish sculptors
 Valley of Death (Bydgoszcz)

References

Bibliography
 Archives and Pomeranian Museum of the Home Army and the Military Service in Toruń, 

1914 births
1997 deaths
Polish sculptors
Polish male sculptors
Artists from Bydgoszcz
Home Army officers